Jericó Abramo Masso (first name also spelled Yericó; born 17 October 1975) is a Mexican politician affiliated with the Institutional Revolutionary Party. He currently represents the Seventh Federal Electoral District of Coahuila in the Chamber of Deputies of the LXIII Legislature of the Mexican Congress.

Life

The late 1990s saw Abramo's entry into the PRI. He was the deputy chief of financing for the state party and founded the Business Political Institute at the same time between 1998 and 1999. He also worked as social management coordinator on the party's 1999 Saltillo municipal presidential campaign. Between 1999 and 2001, he was the secretary general of the Saltillo chapter of the Confederación Nacional de Organizaciones Populares, and from 2001 to 2002, he headed the PRI in Saltillo while serving as a state-level party councilor.

In 2000, voters sent Abramo to his first public office, as a city councilor. When his three-year term concluded, he moved to direct the city's public services department, a post he left in 2005 to coordinate a state program titled "24 Municipalities of Coahuila".

In 2006 Abramo was elected to represent the fourth federal district in the LX Legislature. He served as president on a special commission to investigate the Pasta de Conchos mine disaster that occurred in San Juan de Sabinas, in which 65 miners perished. He also served on the Communications, Economy, Youth and Sports, and Special for the Cuenca de Burgos Region Commissions, and as a national councillor for the PRI.

A year after his first term as a deputy ended, Abramo returned to public office, this time as the municipal president of Saltillo, from 2010 to 2013. During this time, he spent a year as the vice president of the National Federation of Municipalities of Mexico. At the end of his term, he decided to move to Mexico City with his family instead of taking on a position in the state government or running as a local deputy in 2014. Instead, in 2014, Abramo became the state president of Fundación Colosio, A.C.

In 2015 voters returned Abramo to the Chamber of Deputies, this time, from the seventh federal district. He is a secretary on the Energy and Cooperative Development and Social Economy Commissions, and a member of three others.

Masso has indicated his interest in potentially seeking the PRI gubernatorial nomination at the next elections.

See also
 List of presidents of Saltillo Municipality

References

1975 births
Living people
Politicians from Saltillo
Municipal presidents in Coahuila
Members of the Chamber of Deputies (Mexico) for Coahuila
Institutional Revolutionary Party politicians
21st-century Mexican politicians
Deputies of the LXIII Legislature of Mexico